Battistero di San Giovanni may refer to:

Battistero di San Giovanni (Florence)
Battistero di San Giovanni (Pisa)
Battistero di San Giovanni (Siena)